The unicolored antwren (Myrmotherula unicolor) is a species of bird in the family Thamnophilidae. It is endemic to southeastern Brazil.

Its natural habitats are subtropical or tropical moist lowland forest and subtropical or tropical dry shrubland. It is threatened by habitat loss.

References

External links

BirdLife Species Factsheet.

unicolored antwren
Birds of the Atlantic Forest
Endemic birds of Brazil
unicolored antwren
Taxonomy articles created by Polbot